Federal Reserve Statistical Release H.4.1
summarizes the balance sheet of the Federal Reserve System of the United States.
The releases are weekly, usually each Thursday, generally at 4:30 p.m.

External links
Official site
Digitized historical H.4.1 releases

Federal Reserve System